The Sonnar T* 135 mm 1.8 ZA (SAL-135F18Z) is a high-quality wide-aperture prime telephoto lens compatible with cameras using the Sony α lens mount. It was designed and is manufactured by Sony in Japan in collaboration with Zeiss.

The lens is also compatible with cameras using the predecessor Minolta AF lens mount, however some Minolta SLR cameras will claim an aperture of 1.7 when the lens is in fact only capable of 1.8.

See also
 Zeiss Sonnar

Sources
Dyxum lens data

135
135
Camera lenses introduced in 2007